José Olfinas Vera (died August 15, 1956) was a Filipino politician, judge and film studio executive.

Vera served as Senator of the Philippines from the 7th to 10th Legislature (1925–1935) as the 6th district representative Vera served in the seventh branch of the Court of First Instance of Manila as judge ad interim. Beyond politics, he was also the head of the production studio Sampaguita Pictures which he handed over to his son-in-law Jose R. Perez in the 1950s.

In 2004, the Sangguniang Panlungsod of Quezon City honored Vera by renaming Granada Street, which runs through the old Sampaguita Pictures estate, after him.

References

Senators of the 7th Philippine Legislature
Senators of the 9th Philippine Legislature
Senators of the 10th Philippine Legislature
Nacionalista Party politicians
1956 deaths

Year of birth missing
Filipino judges